Maurice Bingham Adams FRIBA (1849–1933) was a British architect in the Arts and Crafts style.

Life
Adams was born in 1849 and educated in Lewes, Sussex, England.  After completing his articles as an apprentice architect, he worked as an assistant to Sir William Emerson and commenced independent practice in 1873. He was awarded ARIBA in 1876 and FRIBA in 1886. His wife was Emily (died 1927) and their marriage lasted 60 years: they had one son and six daughters.  He retired in 1923 and died on 17 August 1933 in Brentford, Middlesex.

Work
He was Architect to Brighton Council and from 1872 till his retirement was editor of the weekly Building News, whose owner John Passmore Edwards also commissioned him for many buildings, notably in the Bedford Park garden suburb, designing several houses there and completing St Michael and All Angels. In 1878 he moved to Bedford Park, and was one of the first two churchwardens of  St Michael and All Angels. He was a prolific architect of public libraries.  Other work included Camberwell Polytechnic and Art Gallery and country houses in England, Australia and the USA.  He published several books including Artists' Homes (1883) and Modern Cottage Architecture (1904).

Buildings
 Passmore Edwards Public Library, Shepherd's Bush
 Passmore Edwards Public Library, Acton
Passmore Edwards Library, Burgess Park, Camberwell
 Isolation Home, Chalfont St. Peter, Buckinghamshire
 Frederick Greene Home, Chalfont St. Peter, Buckinghamshire
 Lord Leighton Memorial, Camberwell
 Central Library, Hammersmith,
 Passmore Edwards Polytechnic, Camberwell
 12 and 14 Newton Grove, 5 Priory Avenue, Bedford Park

References

Architects from Sussex
1849 births
1933 deaths
Fellows of the Royal Institute of British Architects
Arts and Crafts movement
Churchwardens